The High Commissioner from New Zealand to the Solomon Islands is New Zealand's foremost diplomatic representative in the Solomon Islands, and in charge of New Zealand's diplomatic mission in the Solomon Islands.

The High Commission is located in Honiara, the Solomon Islands' capital city.  New Zealand has maintained a resident High Commissioner in the Solomon Islands since 1978.

As fellow members of the Commonwealth of Nations, diplomatic relations between New Zealand and the Solomon Islands are at governmental level, rather than between Heads of State.  Thus, the countries exchange High Commissioners, rather than ambassadors.

List of heads of mission

Commissioners to the Solomon Islands

Non-resident Commissioners, resident in Papua New Guinea
 Michael Mansfield (1977–1978)

High Commissioners to the Solomon Islands
 1978–1980: John Graeme Ammundsen (*1941) 15 Oct 1975 - 10 Feb 1976 Representative in the Cook Islands, 1980–1982: Ambassador in Tehran, 1982-1985: Consul-General in Bahrain, succeeding George Horsburgh,  1985-1988: High Commissioner to Nukuʻalofa 1991–1995: Ambassador in The Hague, 1995–1996: Ambassador in Riyadh
 Mary Chamberlin (1980–1983)
 Rodney Denham (1983–1986)
 Alison Pearce (1986–1988)
 Bernard Hillier (1988–1992)
 Tia Barrett (1992–1996)
 Rhys Richards (1996–1999)
 Nick Hurley (1999–2002)
 Heather Riddell (2002–2004)
 Brian Sanders (2004–2006)
Deborah Panckhurst (2006—2009)
Mark Ramsden (2009—)
Don Higgins (2016— )

See also 
 List of High Commissioners of New Zealand to Samoa
 List of High Commissioners of New Zealand to South Africa

References

Solomon Islands, High Commissioners from New Zealand to
 
New Zealand